Bas Roorda (born 13 February 1973 in Assen) is a former Dutch football goalkeeper. His former teams are NEC Nijmegen, Roda JC, FC Groningen, and PSV Eindhoven.

On 26 March 2010, it was announced his expiring contract with PSV, will not be extended.
He played one match for PSV, on 3 April 2008, he came on as a substitute for Heurelho Gomes in an away game against Fiorentina.
He came on in the 60th minute of the game, conceding no goals.

References
(Dutch)

1973 births
Living people
Dutch footballers
Association football goalkeepers
Eredivisie players
PSV Eindhoven players
FC Groningen players
NEC Nijmegen players
Roda JC Kerkrade players
People from Assen
Footballers from Drenthe